La grotte or la grotte may refer to:

Nicolas de La Grotte (1530 – c. 1600), French composer
La Grotte, song by Debussy
La Grotte des Fées, a cave in the Auvergne region of France
Prix de la Grotte, a horse race run at Longchamp